This is a list of films produced in the Cinema of Austria in the 1940s ordered by year of release. For an alphabetical list of articles on Austrian films see :Category:Austrian films.

1940s

1944

1946

1947

1948

1949

External links
 Austrian film at the Internet Movie Database
http://www.austrianfilm.com/

1940s
Austrian
Films

de:Liste österreichischer Filme